Khvajeh Hoseynabad (also Romanized as Khvājeh Ḩoseynābād; also known as Khājeh Hoseyn Ābād) is a village in Kardeh Rural District, in the Central District of Mashhad County, Razavi Khorasan Province, Iran. At the 2006 census, its population was 171, in 45 families.

References 

Populated places in Mashhad County